Kris Martin (born 1972 in Kortrijk) is a Belgian conceptual visual artist. His work consists of monumental and small-scale sculptures, drawings and interventions.

Recurring themes in his work are the notion of time, history and the transience of human existence. His artwork also explores the relationship between the creators and the consumers of art, and combines elements of contemplation with humour and playfulness.

Among his best known works are 'Mandi XVIII', a plaster cast of the Laocoon group with the snakes omitted, and '100 years' a sculpture that will explode in 100 years from its conception. Martin has worked with curators Jan Hoet and Jens Hoffmann.

Martin held his first solo show in 2000.  Since then he has mounted many solo exhibitions, and his work has been included in dozens of group exhibitions.

In 2020, a retrospective of Martin's work was held at S.M.A.K Ghent titled EXIT. The exhibition gathered many well known works amongst which the iconic Altar (2004), with recent additions such as Water (2020), a spread of vessels holding the life sustaining liquid.

Solo shows
2000 - Wahnsinn, Garden of Museum Dhondt-Dhaenens, Deurle 
2004 - Beaulieu Gallery, Wortegem-Petegem
2005 - Neuer Aachener Kunstverein, Aachen; Sies + Höke, Düsseldorf
2006 - Deus ex machina, Johann König, Berlin
2007 - MoMA PS1, New York; My Private 5, Piazza San Marco, Venedig; Sies + Höke, Düsseldorf; Marc Foxx, Los Angeles
 2009 - Aspen Art Museum, Aspen; Sies + Höke, Düsseldorf; Johann König, Berlin
 2010 - FESTUM, White Cube, London; T.Y.F.F.S.H., K20 Kunstsammlung Nordrhein-Westfalen, Düsseldorf; Almine Rech Gallery, Brüssel/Brussels
 2011 - Sies + Höke, Düsseldorf; Marc Foxx, Los Angeles; The Magnificent Seven: Hammarby!, Wattis Institute for Contemporary Arts, San Francisco
 2012 - Every Day of the Weak, Kestnergesellschaft, Hannover, Kunstmuseum Bonn, Aargauer Kunsthaus, Aarau; Mandi VIII, Lehmbruck-Museum, Duisburg; DO NOT CROSS THE RED LINE, Kunst-Station Sankt Peter, Köln; Festum II, Theseustempel, Kunsthistorisches Museum, Wien
 2013 - Somebody, Sies + Höke, Düsseldorf; White Cube, London; Künstlerraum, K21 Kunstsammlung Nordrhein-Westfalen, Düsseldorf
 2016 - König Galerie, Berlin.
2020 - EXIT, S.M.A.K, Ghent.

References

External links
 EXIT, Kris Martin Ghent retrospective, Flash Art issue 330, Elaine YJ Zheng
Kris Martin on Artsy Kris Martin on Artsy
 Interview with Martin in the online magazine of Kunstsammlung Nordrhein-Westfalen
 passage about Martin in 'Art for the people: a collector's journal' by Michael K. Corbin
 Catalogue to the overview exhibition "Everyday of the Weak", issued by Distanz
 Kris Martin at Sies + Höke gallery
 Kris Martin on ArtFacts

1972 births
Living people
Belgian artists